Marguerite Olive Nichols (August 3, 1891 – March 17, 1941) was an American silent film actress. She starred in 21 films between 1915 and 1918. Actress Norma Nichols was her sister.

Marriage and death
Nichols was born in Los Angeles, California. She was married to comedy film producer Hal Roach for the last 26 years of her life. (He survived her by more than a half-century, dying at age 100 in 1992). They had two children, Hal Jr. and Margaret Roach. She died from pneumonia on March 17, 1941, in Los Angeles.

Filmography

The Quality of Forgiveness (1915)
Beulah (1915)
The Maid of the Wild (1915)
Counsel for the Defense (1915)
Big Brother (1916)
Little Mary Sunshine (1916) .... Sylvia Sanford
The Witch of the Mountains (1916)
The Reclamation (1916) .... Edith Phelan
Jack (1916) (as Margaret Nichols)
The Oath of Hate (1916) (as Margaret Nichols)
Pay Dirt (1916) .... Kate Gardner
The Matrimonial Martyr (1916) .... Phyllis Burnham
Dust (1916) (as Margaret Nichols) .... Mina
The Dancer (1916)
The Strength of Donald McKenzie (1916) (as Margaret Nichols)
Faith's Reward (1916)
Youth's Endearing Charm (1916) (as Margaret Nichols) .... Maud Horton
The Torch Bearer (1916) (as Margaret Nichols)
The Power of Evil (1916) .... Laurine Manners
Sold at Auction (1917) .... Helen
When Baby Forgot (1917) (as Margaret Nichols) .... Janet Watson
The Girl o' Dreams (1918) (as Margaret Nichols) .... Mrs. Leonard

External links

 
 

1891 births
1941 deaths
American silent film actresses
Deaths from pneumonia in California
Actresses from Los Angeles
20th-century American actresses
Burials at Calvary Cemetery (Los Angeles)